The 1891 Massachusetts gubernatorial election was held on November 3, 1891. Incumbent Democratic Governor William Russell was re-elected to a second term in office over Republican U.S. Representative Charles H. Allen.

Russell was the first Democratic Governor of Massachusetts re-elected to a second term in office since George S. Boutwell in 1851 and the first ever re-elected by popular vote.

General election

Results

See also
 1891 Massachusetts legislature

References

Governor
1891
Massachusetts
November 1891 events